is a Japanese professional golfer.

Early life
Kuramoto was born in Hiroshima Prefecture. He turned professional in 1981.

Professional career
Kuramoto won 30 tournaments on the Japan Golf Tour, ranking fifth on the career list. He ranks seventh on the career money list with earnings of just over 1 billion ¥.

Kuramoto was medalist at the 1992 PGA Tour qualifying school and had full playing rights on the tour in 1993. He played 65 times on the PGA Tour from 1978 to 1997. His best finish was tied for fourth place at the 1982 Open Championship, which was also his best finish in a major championship.

Senior career
In 2005, Kuramoto turned 50 and was eligible to play on the Champions Tour. He qualified at the 2005 Champions Tour qualifying school. He made his first start at the Turtle Bay Championship in January 2006. His best finish on the Champions Tour was a fourth-place finish in the 2006 Wal-Mart First Tee Open at Pebble Beach. He also won two European Senior Tour events in 2010 and 2012.

Amateur wins
1975 Japan Amateur Championship
1977 Japan Amateur Championship
1980 Japan Amateur Championship

Professional wins (47)

Japan Golf Tour wins (30)

*Note: Tournament shortened to 54 holes due to rain.

Japan Golf Tour playoff record (6–4)

Other wins (5)
1981 Wakayama Open, Hyogo Open
1983 House Foods Kyosen Invitation
1985 KSB Setonaikai Open
2014 Legend Charity Pro-Am

European Senior Tour wins (2)

Japan PGA Senior Tour wins (10)
2007 Big Raisac Senior Open
2010 Japan Senior Open, Handa Cup Senior Masters
2014 Japan Senior Open, Iwasaki Shiratsuyu Senior Tournament
2015 Kyoshinkai Hiroshima Senior Championship
2016 Uniden Grand Senior Championship, Iwasaki Shiratsuyu Senior Tournament
2018 Uniden Grand Senior Championship
2019 Starts Senior Golf Tournament

Results in major championships

Note: Kuramoto never played in the Masters Tournament.

CUT = missed the half-way cut (3rd round cut in 1984 Open Championship)
"T" = tied

Team appearances
This list may be incomplete.

Amateur
Eisenhower Trophy (representing Japan): 1976

Professional
Dunhill Cup (representing Japan): 1985, 1992
Four Tours World Championship (representing Japan): 1988, 1990
Royal Trophy (Asian team): 2006 (non-playing captain)

See also
1992 PGA Tour Qualifying School graduates
List of golfers with most Japan Golf Tour wins
Lowest rounds of golf

External links

Masahiro Kuramoto at the PGA of Japan official website

Japanese male golfers
Japan Golf Tour golfers
PGA Tour golfers
PGA Tour Champions golfers
European Senior Tour golfers
Sportspeople from Hiroshima Prefecture
1955 births
Living people